Fostoria is an unincorporated community and census-designated place in Watertown Township, Tuscola County, Michigan, United States. Its population was 694 as of the 2010 census. Fostoria has a post office with ZIP code 48435.

Geography

Demographics

History
Michigan Governor Henry H. Crapo once owned most of the pine forestland in the area and had a line of the Pere Marquette Railway run through Fostoria. The community was named in 1881 for Crapo's foreman, Thomas Foster. Its first post office operated from July 1882 until May 1883.

References

Unincorporated communities in Tuscola County, Michigan
Unincorporated communities in Michigan
Census-designated places in Tuscola County, Michigan
Census-designated places in Michigan
Populated places established in 1881
1881 establishments in Michigan